Steve is a masculine given name.

Steve may also refer to:
 STEVE, an atmospheric phenomenon
 Steve (film), a 2010 short film by Rupert Friend
 Steve (talk show), an American talk show hosted by comedian Steve Harvey
 Steve (Minecraft), a fictional character in the video game Minecraft

See also
 Project Steve, a tongue-in-cheek list of scientists
 Stef (disambiguation)
 Stephen (disambiguation)
 Stevedore
 Steven
 Steeves, surname
 Stevie (disambiguation)
 Steve's Ice Cream